Gastrolobium sericeum is a flowering plant in the family Fabaceae. It is endemic to the south-west of Western Australia. It is a prostrate, low shrub with pendulous yellow, green, red or nearly black pea-flowers from spring to summer.

Description
The branchlets more or less needle-shaped and smooth. Flowering occurs from September to December and the fruit is a pod. It is not known whether this species shares the toxic properties of many other members of the genus Gastrolobium.

Taxonomy
Gastrolobium sericeum was first formally described in 1864 by botanist James Edward Smith and the description published in Transactions of the Linnean Society of London .  He gave it the name Chorizema sericeum Subsequently, it was placed in the genus Brachysema. Finally, in 1995, botanist Michael Crisp placed the species in the genus Gastrolobium along with a number of other Brachysema species.

Distribution
This species is usually found along the edge of streams or swamps.

References

sericeum
Plants described in 1864
Rosids of Western Australia
Endemic flora of Western Australia
Taxa named by James Edward Smith